The R700 road is a regional road in Ireland which runs northwest–southeast from Kilkenny city centre to New Ross in County Wexford.

En route it passes through Bennettsbridge, Thomastown and  Inistioge before crossing the River Barrow into County Wexford. 
It terminates in New Ross via Craywell Road, John Street, Bridge Street, (and via Quay Street and North Street) at a junction with the R723 at O'Hanrahan Bridge in the town centre.

See also
Roads in Ireland
National primary road
National secondary road

References
Roads Act 1993 (Classification of Regional Roads) Order 2019 – Department of Transport

Regional roads in the Republic of Ireland
Roads in County Kilkenny
Roads in County Wexford